Stian Boretti (born 20 December 1981) is a Norwegian former professional tennis player.

Born in Nesodden, Boretti had a career best singles ranking of 375 on the professional tour, winning six ITF Futures singles titles. He had a best doubles ranking of 511 and won five ITF Futures doubles tournaments.

Boretti, a five-time King's Cup winner, is the Norwegian record holder for Davis Cup appearances. His Davis Cup career spanned 15-years, between 2000 and 2014, with 26 singles and 12 doubles wins, from 39 ties.

References

External links
 
 
 

1981 births
Living people
Norwegian male tennis players
People from Nesodden
Sportspeople from Viken (county)
21st-century Norwegian people